Azhdaha, Azhdahak, Ezhdeha or Azhdar (اژدر) is a mythical creature in Iranian mythology, roughly equivalent to the dragon. They are gigantic snake-like creatures living in the air, in the sea, or on the earth. Sad dar-e nathr and sad dar-e Bondahesh, Shahnameh and Garshaspnameh are among the principal texts that contain information about the creature. In Persian literature, Azhdahas are depicted as a giant snake or lizard with wings.

According to tradition, they have a huge body, a fierce face, their mouths are wide with many teeth, and their eyes are bright. Azhdahās are actually normal snakes, according to Ajāyeb ul-Makhlooghāt, a book by Mohammad b. Mahmoud b. Ahmad-e Tusi (wrote in 1160 AD), "when a snake lives 100 years and its length becomes 30 Gazes (a traditional measurement unit approximate to a meter), it is called an azhdahā". He also wrote that "because of their harassment to other creatures, God eventually will throw them into the sea and in there, their body will continue to grow, such that their length becomes more than 10,000 Gazes. Then in the sea, they evolve to have two wings, like a fish, and the waves of the sea are because of their movements. Eating the heart of an Azhdahā brings courage and bravery. Their skins are suitable to healing the wound of love, and if someone buries an azhdahā's head in soil, the conditions of that soil will become good."

Another work which was considerably influenced by the Ajayeb ul-Makhlooghaat, is the Nuzhat al-Quloob. Completed in 1339–1340, the author and historian, Hamd Allah Mustaufi Qazvini, describes the azhada as being terrible in appearance, with flaming eyes, a wide mouth, and a body of enormous length. Like Ahmad- e-Tusi, he, too, maintains that the dragon was at first a serpent, and it was only after he became more than thirty yards long that it came to be called an azhada. He says that after the azhada was cast into the sea by God, for terrorizing the people on land, it developed fins and continued to grow in the sea. Eventually it grew so much that it caused damage in the sea, and after it was killed, its body was cast up on the shore to provide food for the inhabitants of the Land of Gog and Magog.

In Shahnameh, the national epic of Greater Iran, azhdahās appear in a number of stories. Sām, Rostam, Esfandiar, Eskandar, Bahram V (Gur) are among the heroes that kill an azhada.

References 

Persian legendary creatures
Legendary reptiles